The 1991 CONCACAF Women's Championship was the first staging of the CONCACAF Women's Championship, the international women's association football tournament for North American, Central American and Caribbean nations organized by CONCACAF. The tournament took place in Port-au-Prince, Haiti, between 18 and 27 April 1991 and consisted of eight national teams. The matches were 80 minutes long.

The United States won the tournament after defeating Canada 5–0 in the final match. They became CONCACAF's single qualifier for the 1991 FIFA Women's World Cup, which was hosted by China in November and ended with a U.S. victory.

Participating teams
From the North American Zone:

From the Central American Zone:

From the Caribbean Zone:
 (hosts)

Venues

Results

Group stage

Group A

Group B

Knockout stage

Bracket

Semi-finals

Third place playoff

Final
United States won the tournament and qualified for 1991 FIFA Women's World Cup.

Awards

Statistics

Goalscorers

11 goals
 Michelle Akers
8 goals
 April Heinrichs
7 goals

 Charmaine Hooper
 Brandi Chastain

5 goals

 Mia Hamm
 Carin Jennings

4 goals

 Annie Caron
 Fabienne Gareau
 Lydia Vamos

3 goals

 Tracey Bates
 Joy Biefeld-Fawcett
 Wendy Gebauer

2 goals

 Julie Foudy
 Kristine Lilly

1 goal

 Connie Cant
 Joan McEachern
 Karla Alemán
 Maritza Álvarez

Own goals
 Bernadette Mairs (playing against )

Final ranking

References

External links
Tables & results at RSSSF.com

Women's Championship
CONCACAF Women's Championship tournaments
1991 FIFA Women's World Cup qualification
C
History of the United States women's national soccer team
1991 in Haitian sport
CON
20th century in Port-au-Prince
Events in Port-au-Prince
Sport in Port-au-Prince